In Finnish mythology, the Sampo is a magical device or object described in many different ways that was constructed by the blacksmith Ilmarinen and that brought riches and good fortune to its holder, akin to the horn of plenty (cornucopia) of Greek mythology.  When the Sampo was stolen, Ilmarinen's homeland fell upon hard times. He sent an expedition to retrieve it, but in the ensuing battle it was smashed and lost at sea.

In the Kalevala 
The Sampo is a pivotal element of the plot of the Finnish epic poem Kalevala, compiled in 1835 (and expanded in 1849) by Elias Lönnrot based on Finnish oral tradition.

In the expanded second version of the poem, the Sampo is forged by Ilmarinen, a legendary smith, to fulfill a task set by the witch queen of Pohjola, Louhi, in return for her daughter's hand.

 "Ilmarinen, worthy brother,
 Thou the only skilful blacksmith,
 Go and see her wondrous beauty,
 See her gold and silver garments,
 See her robed in finest raiment,
 See her sitting on the rainbow,
 Walking on the clouds of purple.
 Forge for her the magic Sampo,
 Forge the lid in many colors,
 Thy reward shall be the virgin,
 Thou shalt win this bride of beauty;
 Go and bring the lovely maiden
 To thy home in Kalevala."

Ilmarinen works for many days at a mighty forge until he finally succeeds in creating the Sampo:

 On one side the flour is grinding,
 On another salt is making,
 On a third is money forging,
 And the lid is many-colored.
 Well the Sampo grinds when finished,
 To and fro the lid in rocking,
 Grinds one measure at the day-break,
 Grinds a measure fit for eating,
 Grinds a second for the market,
 Grinds a third one for the store-house.

Later, Louhi steals the Sampo, and then Ilmarinen and Väinämöinen enter her stronghold in secret and retrieve it. Louhi pursues them and combats Väinämöinen. In the struggle, Louhi is vanquished but the Sampo is destroyed.

Interpretation
The Sampo has been interpreted in many ways: a world pillar or world tree, a compass or astrolabe, a chest containing a treasure, a Byzantine coin die, a decorated Vendel period shield, a Christian relic, etc. In the Kalevala, compiler Lönnrot interpreted it to be a quern or mill of some sort that made flour, salt, and gold out of thin air. The world pillar/tree hypothesis was argued for by figures such as theosophian Pekka Ervast, historian of religions Uno Harva and the linguist Eemil Nestor Setälä in the early 20th century.

According to the archaeologist Elena Kuz'mina the Sampo mill myth originates from the Indo-European skambhá (support, pillar, column), and was borrowed into Finno-Ugric. In the Atharvaveda the 'skambhá' is a creature that supports the universe, analogous to the World Tree - the Sampo has been claimed to be the Finnish equivalent of the world tree.

Similar devices 

In the Aarne–Thompson classification systems of Folk-Tales, tale type 565 refers to a magic mill that continuously produces food or salt. Examples include Why the Sea is Salt (Norway, based on the poem Grottasöngr), Sweet porridge (Germanic), and The Water Mother (Chinese). Such devices have been included into modern tales such as Strega Nona (1975, children's book). Variants on the theme with a cautionary tale and pupil-master relationship include The Master and his Pupil (English), and Goethe's 1797 poem The Sorcerer's Apprentice.

The Cornucopia of Greek mythology also produces endless goods, and some versions of the Grail myth emphasize how the Grail creates food and goods.

Japanese folktale Shiofuki usu speaks of a grindstone that could be used to create anything. Like Sampo, it too was lost to the sea, endlessly grinding salt.

The Mahabharatha speaks about the Akshaya Patra, a vessel or bowl capable of creating food. It stopped providing at the end of the day when the lady of the house had her last meal. Similarly in Irish myth the Cauldron of the Dagda (coire ansic or "un-dry cauldron") was a magical vessel that satisfied any number of people.

Influences

The 1959 Soviet-Finnish film Sampo is loosely based on the story.
The Finnish TV series Rauta-aika (The Iron Age, 1982), based on Kalevala, has an extended sequence where Ilmarinen and his smiths build the Sampo, which is a Byzantine coin die.
 In The Quest for Kalevala, a Donald Duck story by Disney cartoonist Don Rosa based on the Kalevala, Scrooge McDuck, Donald Duck and Huey, Dewey, and Louie travel to Finland trying to reveal the location of the remains of the Sampo, a mythical machine that can produce gold.
 In 1933, A. A. Öpik named a genus of fossil brachiopod Sampo.
Asteroid 2091 Sampo is named after the artifact.
  The Finnish heavy metal band Amorphis has a song called Sampo on their 2009 album Skyforger.
 The Finnish symphonic power metal band Amberian Dawn has a song called Sampo on their 2010 album End of Eden.
The Semantic Computing Group at Aalto University has used Sampo as a generic name for their cultural heritage Web services, most recently BiographySampo (2018).
 Mystery Science Theater 3000 episode 422 includes the 1959 Finnish film The Day The Earth Froze, wherein Louhi the witch spends most of the film trying to make a sampo and the MST characters spend the time wondering what one is.
 The 2020 Finnish Roguelike video game "Noita" includes references to Finnish mythology and runs are finished by using an item that can be named as, and resembles the Sampo.

See also 
 Quern-stone
 Cornucopia
 Uchide no kozuchi
 Bag of Holding

References

External links 

Finnish mythology
Mythological objects
Karelian-Finnish folklore
Magic items